The Europe Triathlon Championships are the main triathlon  championships in Europe organised by Europe Triathlon. Conducted over the 'standard' or 'Olympic' triathlon distance of a 1500m swim, a 40 km bike and 10 km run, the event has been run since 1985. The Europe Triathlon Sprint Championships over a 750m swim, 20 kilometre bike and 5 kilometre run, have been held separately every year since 2016, and sporadically before that, and have also adopted the Europe Triathlon Championships name since 2022.

From the 2018 edition in Glasgow, every four years the standard distance championships will be part of the European Championships multi-sport event.

Summary of championships

Men's medalists

Medals in Men's Triathlon

Women's medalist

Medals in Women's Triathlon

See also
World Triathlon Series

References

External links
European Triathlon Union

 
Triathlon competitions
European championships
Triathlon in Europe